Stade Jean-Dauger is a multi-purpose stadium in Bayonne, France. It is currently used mostly for rugby union matches and is the home stadium of Aviron Bayonnais. After a renovation project completed in 2009, the stadium can hold 14,370 spectators. The stadium is named after the late Jean Dauger, former rugby union and league player who played for Aviron Bayonnais.

It hosted the match between Canada and Fiji during the 1991 Rugby World Cup. Canada won the match 13–3.

In July 2011 the stadium hosted all four matches of the Kopa Baiona. It was a friendly football tournament involving Olympique de Marseille, FC Girondins de Bordeaux, Udinese Calcio and Real Betis. It was won by Udinese Calcio.

References

Multi-purpose stadiums in France
Football venues in France
Rugby union stadiums in France
Rugby World Cup stadiums
Sports venues in Pyrénées-Atlantiques
Sport in Bayonne
Sports venues completed in 1937
1937 establishments in France
Aviron Bayonnais